The Order of the Elephant is a Danish order of chivalry and is Denmark's highest-ranked honour. It has origins in the 15th century, but has officially existed since 1693, and since the establishment of constitutional monarchy in 1849, is now almost exclusively used to honour royalty and heads of state.

History 
A Danish religious confraternity called the Fellowship of the Mother of God, limited to about fifty members of the Danish aristocracy, was founded during the reign of Christian I during the 15th century. The badge of the confraternity showed the Virgin Mary holding her Son within a crescent moon and surrounded with the rays of the sun, and was hung from a collar of links in the form of elephants much like the present collar of the Order. After the Reformation in 1536 the confraternity died out, but a badge in the form of an elephant with his profile on its right side was still awarded by Frederick II. This latter badge may have been inspired by the badge of office of the chaplain of the confraternity which is known to have been in the form of an elephant. The order was instituted in its current form on 1 December 1693 by King Christian V as having only one class consisting of only 30 noble knights in addition to the Grand Master (i.e., the king) and his sons. The statutes of the order were amended in 1958 by a Royal Ordinance so that both men and women could be members of the order.

The elephant and castle design derives from the howdah, a carriage that is mounted in the back of an elephant. This type of carriage was mostly utilized in the Indian subcontinent, and the Danish knew about and thus had the ability to adopt this design since they ruled certain parts of India as part of their small colonial empire. The unfamiliar Indian howdah has been replaced in this instance by a familiar European castle, although the Indian rider has been kept on the elephant.

Composition 
The Danish monarch is the head of the order. The members of the royal family are members of the order, and foreign heads of state are also inducted. In very exceptional circumstances a commoner may also be admitted. The most recent member of the order who was neither a current or former head of state nor royal was Mærsk Mc-Kinney Møller, a leading industrialist and philanthropist.

The order of the Elephant has one class: Knight of the Order of the Elephant (Ridder af Elefantordenen, usually abbreviated as R.E. in letters et cetera). Knights of the order are granted a place in the 1st Class of the Danish order of precedence.

Insignia and habits 

 The collar of the order is of gold. It consists of alternating elephants and towers. On the cover of the elephants there is a D which stands for Dania, mediaeval Latin for Denmark. According to the statutes of the order, the collar is usually only worn on New Years Day (during the Danish monarch's New Years Court) and on major occasions (coronations or jubilees).
 The badge of the order is an elephant made of white-enamelled gold with blue housings.  It is about 5 cm high. On its back the elephant is bearing a watch tower of pink enameled masonry encircled by a row of small table cut diamonds at the bottom with another row just below the crenellation at the top.  In front of the tower and behind the elephant's head (which has a diamond set in its forehead and smaller diamonds for its eyes) a colorfully attired and turbaned Moor mahout is sitting, holding a golden rod; on the right side of the elephant there is a cross of five large table cut diamonds and on the left side the elephant bears the crowned monogram of the monarch reigning when it was made.  At the top of the tower is a large enameled gold ring from which the badge can be hung from the collar or tied to the sash of the Order. There are about 72 elephants at the chancery of the Order or in circulation.  It is estimated that together with an unknown number of elephants in museums around the world, the total number of the elephants is about a hundred.
 The star of the order is an eight-pointed silver star with smooth rays. At its center there is a red enameled disc with a white cross, surrounded by a laurel wreath in silver. It is worn on the left side of the chest.
 The sash of the order is of light-blue silk moiré and 10 cm wide for men 6 cm wide for women. It is placed on the left shoulder with the elephant resting against the right hip. The collar is not worn when the sash is used.
 The order originally had a distinctive habit worn by the knights on very solemn occasions consisting of a white doublet, white breeches, white stockings and white shoes, over which was worn a red mantle with a white lining and with the star of the order embroidered in silver on left side. Over this red mantle was worn a short white shoulder cape with a standing collar, embroidered with scattering of numerous gold flames, upon which was worn the collar of the order (the habit was always worn with the collar of the order, never its ribbon). The habit also had a black hat with a plume of white and red ostrich feathers. This habit was almost identical to that worn by the knights of the Order of the Dannebrog.

Upon the death of a Knight of the Order of the Elephant, the insignia of the order must be returned. There are a few exceptions known.

 Paris, Chancellery museum — collar on display
 Sash and badge of Dwight Eisenhower, on display at his presidential library in the US.

Current knights and officers

Sovereign of the Royal Danish Orders of Chivalry 
 The Queen of Denmark

Current Knights of the Elephant listed by date of appointment 

 20 April 1947: Princess Benedikte of Denmark
 20 April 1947: Queen Anne-Marie of Greece (then Princess Anne-Marie of Denmark)
 8 August 1953: Emperor Akihito of Japan (then Crown Prince)
 21 February 1958: King Harald V of Norway (then Crown Prince)
 6 September 1960: Queen Sirikit of Thailand
 17 February 1961: Count Ingolf of Rosenborg, then Prince of Denmark
 3 May 1963: Empress Farah of Iran
 11 September 1964: Princess Irene of Greece and Denmark
 11 September 1964: Prince Michael of Greece and Denmark
 12 January 1965: King Carl XVI Gustaf of Sweden (then Crown Prince)
 28 September 1965: Prince Hitachi of Japan
 18 June 1968: King Albert II of Belgium (then Prince of Liège)
 14 January 1972: Crown Prince Frederik of Denmark
 14 January 1972: Prince Joachim of Denmark
 16 January 1973: Princess Christina, Mrs. Magnuson (then Princess Christina of Sweden)
 12 February 1973: Queen Sonja of Norway (then Crown Princess)
 30 April 1974: King Charles III of the United Kingdom (then Prince of Wales)
 29 October 1975: Princess Beatrix of the Netherlands (later Queen)
 17 March 1980: King Juan Carlos I of Spain
 17 March 1980: Queen Sofia of Spain
 25 February 1981: Vigdís Finnbogadóttir, former President of the Republic of Iceland
 25 June 1984: António Santos Ramalho Eanes, former President of the Portuguese Republic
 3 September 1985: Queen Silvia of Sweden
 20 July 1991: Crown Prince Haakon of Norway
 13 October 1992: Princess Märtha Louise of Norway
 5 July 1993: Lech Wałęsa, former President of the Republic of Poland
 7 September 1994: Martti Ahtisaari, former President of the Republic of Finland
 16 May 1995: Queen Paola of Belgium
 14 July 1995:  Crown Princess Victoria of Sweden
 17 November 1995: Princess Alexandra, Countess of Frederiksborg
 18 November 1996: Ólafur Ragnar Grímsson, former President of the Republic of Iceland
 14 January 1997: Crown Prince Pavlos of Greece, Prince of Denmark
 18 March 1997: Guntis Ulmanis, former President of the Republic of Latvia
 31 January 1998: King Willem-Alexander of the Netherlands (then Prince of Orange)
 27 April 1998: Queen Noor of Jordan
 2 June 1998: Empress Michiko of Japan
 3 May 1999: Fernando Henrique Cardoso, former President of the Federative Republic of Brazil
 23 May 2000: Emil Constantinescu, former President of the Republic of Romania
 17 October 2000: Petar Stoyanov, former President of the Republic of Bulgaria
 7 February 2001: King Maha Vajiralongkorn of Thailand (then crown prince)
 3 April 2001: Tarja Halonen, former President of the Republic of Finland
 10 October 2001: Milan Kučan, former President of the Republic of Slovenia
 28 May 2002: King Philippe of Belgium (then Duke of Brabant)
 20 October 2003: Grand Duke Henri of Luxembourg
 20 October 2003: Grand Duchess Maria Teresa of Luxembourg
 16 March 2004: Ion Iliescu, former President of Romania
 9 May 2004: Crown Princess Mary of Denmark
 16 November 2004: Emperor Naruhito of Japan (then Crown Prince)
 29 March 2006: Georgi Parvanov, former President of the Republic of Bulgaria
 12 September 2007: Luiz Inácio Lula da Silva, President of the Federative Republic of Brazil
 18 February 2008: Felipe Calderón Hinojosa, former President of Mexico
 24 May 2008: Princess Marie of Denmark, wife of Prince Joachim of Denmark
 11 May 2011: Lee Myung-bak, former President of South Korea
 23 October 2012: Ivan Gašparovič, former President of Slovakia
 4 April 2013: Sauli Niinistö, current President of Finland
 17 May 2014: Crown Princess Mette-Marit of Norway
 21 October 2014: Ivo Josipović, former President of Croatia
 17 March 2015: Queen Máxima of the Netherlands
 13 April 2016: Enrique Peña Nieto, former President of Mexico.
 24 January 2017: Guðni Thorlacius Jóhannesson, President of Iceland
 28 March 2017: Queen Mathilde of Belgium
 28 August 2018: Emmanuel Macron, President of the French Republic
 10 November 2021: Frank-Walter Steinmeier, President of the Republic of Germany
 21 January 2022:  Princess Ingrid Alexandra of Norway

Officers of the Chapter of the Royal Danish Orders of Chivalry 
 Chancellor: Prince Joachim, younger son of the Queen
 Secretary: Henning Fode, Chamberlain, Private Secretary to the Queen
 Treasurer: Ambassador Paul Fischer, LL.D., Chamberlain
 Secretary of the Chapter: Per Thornit, Chamberlain, Chief of TRH the Crown Prince and the Crown Princess's Household
 Historiographer of the Chapter: Knud J.V. Jespersen, dr. phil.

Other notable knights 
Previous knights have included:
 James III, King of Scots and son-in-law of Christian I of Denmark (1469)
 Tycho Brahe, astronomer (1578)
 Heinrich Rantzau, German-Danish humanist, writer, astrologer and statesman (1580)
 Jacob van Wassenaer Obdam, Dutch lieutenant-admiral (1659)
 Egbert Bartholomeusz Kortenaer, Dutch vice-admiral (1659)
 Cornelis Tromp, Dutch and Danish admiral-general (1676)
 Ernst Albrecht von Eberstein, military leader (1676)
 Ernst Heinrich von Schimmelmann, politician and landowner (1790)
 Duke William Frederick Philip of Württemberg, Danish general and Governor of Copenhagen during the (Battle of Copenhagen (1801))
 Albert, Prince Consort, (10 January 1843)
 J.B.S. Estrup, Danish landowner, politician and President of the Council of State (1878)
 Victor Emmanuel III, King of Italy (1891)
 Grand Duke Nicholas Nikolaevich of Russia (1909)
 Vilhelm Thomsen, professor, Dr. Phil., Danish linguist (1912)
 H.N. Andersen, Danish businessman, Consul-General, titular Councilor of State (1919)
 C.G.E. Mannerheim, President of the Republic of Finland, Marshal of Finland (1919)
 Umberto II, King of Italy, then Prince of Piedmont as heir to the throne (1922)
Hirohito, Emperor of Japan then Crown prince (1923)
 Stanisław Wojciechowski, President of the Republic of Poland (1923)
 Tomáš Masaryk, President of the Czechoslovak Republic (1925)
 Reza Shah of Persia (former name of Iran) (1937)
 Miklós Horthy, Austro-Hungarian vice-admiral, Regent of the Kingdom of Hungary (1940)
 Bernard Law Montgomery, 1st Viscount Montgomery of Alamein, British Field Marshal (1945)
 Dwight D. Eisenhower, President of the United States of America, General of the Army (1945)
 Niels Bohr, professor, Dr. Phil. & Scient. & Techn., Danish physicist and Nobel laureate, Manifested Copenhagen interpretation ("atom theory") (1947)
 Prince Philip, Duke of Edinburgh (1947)
 Queen Elizabeth II of the United Kingdom (then Princess) (1947)
 Sir Winston Churchill, British prime minister and Nobel laureate (1950)
 Haile Selassie, Emperor of Ethiopia (21 November 1954)
 Princess Elisabeth of Denmark, Danish diplomat and cousin of Margrethe II of Denmark (1962)
 King Constantine II of Greece (1962)
 Julius Nyerere, President of the United Republic of Tanzania (1970)
 Josip Broz Tito, President of the Socialist Federative Republic of Yugoslavia (1974)
 Richard von Weizsäcker, President of the Federal Republic of Germany (1989)
 Nicolae Ceauşescu, President of the Socialist Republic of Romania (Note: Awarded on the November 1980 state visit to Denmark, but revoked by the Queen on 23 December 1989.  The insignia have been returned to Denmark and Ceauşescu's name has been deleted from the official rolls.)
 Oscar Luigi Scalfaro, President of the Italian Republic (1993)
 Nelson Mandela, President of the Republic of South Africa (1996)
 Mærsk Mc-Kinney Møller, Danish shipping magnate (2000)

See also 
 Elephant and castle symbol
 Order of the Dannebrog

References

External links 
 
 Афонасенко И.М. Гербы российских кавалеров в гербовнике датского ордена Слона (Afonasenko, Igor. Coats of Arms of Russian Knights in the "Elefantordenens Våbenbog") / Геральдика - вспомогательная историческая дисциплина: Семинар ГЭ 24 апреля 2019 г. СПб., 2019. 34 стр. 
 Some of the elephant badges on exhibit at Rosenborg Castle:
Order of the Elephant and Order of the Elephant Star.
Order of the Elephant of Frederik II.
Order of the Elephant of Christian IV.
Order of the Elephant of Christian V, miniature.
Order of the Elephant of Frederik VII, miniature.
of Dannebrog and Order of Dannebrog Star.
Ordre de l'Union Parfaite.

 For the history and insignia of the original confraternity of Christian I see Boulton, D'Arcy Jonathan Dacre, 1987. The Knights of The Crown: The Monarchical Orders of Knighthood in Later Medieval Europe, 1325–1520, Woodbridge, Suffolk (Boydell Press), (revised edition 2000).
 Database over Danish Medals, including Order of the Elephant

15th-century establishments in Denmark
Elephant, Order of
Elephant, Order of the
Elephant, Order of the
Elephant, Order of the
Orders, decorations, and medals of Denmark